Balwant Singh (born 15 December 1986) is an Indian professional
footballer who last played as a forward for East Bengal in the Indian Super League.

Career

JCT
Born in Hoshiarpur, Punjab, Balwant started his footballing journey with Mahilpur Football Club before joining the academy of JCT before being promoted to their senior team in 2008. He scored his first professional goal for the club on 28 September 2008 against Mahindra United in the 64th minute to help JCT to a huge 7–1 victory. He then scored his second goal for the club on 11 October 2008 against Mohammedan in the 45th minute to help JCT to a 2–0 win. Balwant then scored his last goal of his debut season against Mumbai on 26 November 2008 in the 38th minute, but could not prevent JCT from going down 2–3. He had a productive Durand Cup campaign in his debut season, where JCT reached the semi-finals, with Balwant scoring thrice during the tournament.

He opened his account for the 2009–10 season on 4 October 2009 when he scored a brace as JCT won the match 5–1 against Shillong Lajong before scoring his third and final goal that season against Sporting Goa on 28 January 2010 in the 58th minute in a match JCT won 2–0.

Balwant was among the 6 JCT players who went for a short training stint at Wolverhampton Wanderers in England in 2010. He then scored what went on to be his final goal for JCT during the 2010–11 season against Churchill Brothers on 7 December 2010 in the 37th minute as his team drew the match 1–1.

Salgaocar
When the season ended, JCT were relegated to the I-League 2nd Division, and Balwant was picked up by goan-based Salgaocar on 8 June 2011 on a two-year deal. He made his club debut while on 21 March 2012 against Neftchi FK in the 2012 AFC Cup when he came on as a 79th-minute substitute for Francis Fernandes as his team drew the match 2–2. He then featured in his 2nd AFC Cup match against Al-Wehdat on 10 April 2012 when Salgaocar lost 1–2. Balwant struggled for the majority of his time at Salgaocar; his first season was blighted by long injury lay-offs while in the second season, he was relegated to play only the local league games in Goa and did not make any I-League appearances.

Churchill Brothers
After barely getting any playing time with Salgaocar, Balwant signed for the defending I-League champions Churchill Brothers on 9 July 2013. He made his debut for the club in the league on 5 October 2013 against Mumbai in a game in which he started and played 57 minutes in a 2–0 win. He then scored his first goal for the club five days later on 10 October 2013 against Rangdajied United in the 27th minute to equalize for Churchill Brothers as the match ended 1–1. He scored a brace for Churchill Brothers in the league on 2 November 2013 against United SC to give his team an early lead, however, that lead would not last as the club went on to lose the match 2–3. On 29 April, Balwant was named Indian player of the season for his goal-scoring feat during the season.

Mohun Bagan
Balwant was roped in by Mohun Bagan ahead of 5 other clubs who were chasing his signature due to his 17-goal exploits the previous season for the 2014–15 season on a one-year deal. he would appear 17 times for Bagan in their title winning campaign scoring times, and 4 times in the Federation Cup.

Chennaiyin
Balwant was loaned out to south Indian franchise Chennaiyin for the inaugural season of the Indian Super League by his club Mohun Bagan. On 15 October 2014, he opened the score as Chennaiyin won 2–1 at Goa in their first Indian Super League match, thus becoming the first Indian to score in the league. Balwant would appear 14 times for the Marco Materazzi managed outfit, helping them reach the semi-finals, where they were beaten over two-legs by southern rivals Kerala Blasters.

Balwant was retained by Chennaiyin for the 2015 season.

Mumbai City
Balwant signed with Mumbai City for the 2017–18 Indian Super League season. Head coach Alexandre Guimarães said that "Mumbai City FC lucky to have Balwant Singh as one of the first picks". He picked up an ankle injury during the pre-season training and was consequently ruled out of play for the opener against Bengaluru. On 23 November, it was announced that he returned to training and was available for selection for the next league match against Goa. He scored his first goal for the club against Pune City. In December, he won the Man of the Match award for scoring an equaliser against Kerala Blasters.

ATK
Balwant signed with ATK for two seasons in 2018. He was an integral part of the team that became the 2019–20 Indian Super League champions.

East Bengal
On 12 April 2020, it was officially announced that Balwant has signed on a 2 years contract with Kolkata Giants East Bengal F.C.

International
Balwant made his international debut for India B on 17 February 2010 against Kyrigyzstan in India's opening match of the 2010 AFC Challenge Cup in which he started and played 79 minutes before being substituted for Jeje Lalpekhlua. Later that year, he made his debut for India at the under-23 level when India took part in the 2010 Asian Games. The match took place on 7 November 2010 against Kuwait in which Singh played the whole match as India's under-23s lost 0–2. Then, later in the tournament, he scored his first ever international goal against Singapore U23s in the 62nd minute as India ran out 4–1 winners.
He made his national debut against Mauritius in Hero Tri-Nation Cup and also scored the winning goal.
On 5 September Balwant scored a brace which helped them secure a 2–0 win against Macau in the Asian Cup Qualifying.

Career statistics
Stats accurate as of 27 February 2021

International goals
Scores and results list India's goal tally first.

Honours

Salgaocar
I-League: 2010–11
Federation Cup: 2011

Churchill Brothers
Federation Cup: 2013–14

Mohun Bagan
I-League: 2014–15
Federation Cup: 2015–16

Chennaiyin
Indian Super League: 2015

ATK
Indian Super League: 2019–20

India
Intercontinental Cup: 2017, 2018
King's Cup third place: 2019

India U23
SAFF Championship: 2009

Individual
FPAI Indian Player of the Season: 2013–14

References

External links 

 Balwant Singh on I-League

1986 births
Living people
Footballers from Hoshiarpur
Indian footballers
JCT FC players
Salgaocar FC players
Churchill Brothers FC Goa players
Association football forwards
I-League players
India international footballers
India youth international footballers
Indian Super League players
Chennaiyin FC players
Footballers at the 2010 Asian Games
Mumbai City FC players
2019 AFC Asian Cup players
Asian Games competitors for India
ATK (football club) players
East Bengal Club players
Mohun Bagan AC players
Calcutta Football League players